Desiderio Hernández was a Cuban baseball First baseman in the Cuban League and played in the United States for the All Nations baseball team in 1916.

He is buried at Cementerio Cristóbal Cólon in Havana, Cuba.

References

External links

Cuban League players
Cuban baseball players
Almendares (baseball) players
All Nations players
Habana players
Orientals players
1887 births
Year of death missing